Bei is the Mandarin pinyin romanization of the Chinese surname written  in simplified Chinese and  in traditional Chinese. It is romanized Pei in Wade–Giles. Bei is listed 110th in the Song dynasty classic text Hundred Family Surnames. It is not among the 300 most common surnames in China.

Notable people
 Bei Jinquan (贝锦泉; 1831–1890), Qing dynasty general
 Bei Shizhang (1903–2009), "Father of Chinese Biophysics"
 I. M. Pei (Bei Yuming, 1917–2019), Chinese-American architect
 Peggy Lam (Bei Yujia, born 1928), Hong Kong politician
 Pui Kwan Kay (Bei Junqi; 貝鈞奇; born 1951), Hong Kong businessman
 Bei Ling (貝嶺, born 1959), Chinese poet

Fictional characters 

 Bei Weiwei, a character in Love O2O

References

Chinese-language surnames
Individual Chinese surnames